Bishop Joseph Iyobo is a Nigerian author, journalist, and human rights activist. He serves as the General Overseer of In the Beginning Outreach Ministries International worldwide.

Early life

Joseph Iyobo was born on April 2, 1961 in Ovia Local Government area in Edo State of Nigeria to Chief Eghaghe and Madam Ikubor Iyangbe.

Career 
He heard his call in the year 1983, through prophesy by Prophetess Stella Ogida. He did not hearken to the call after several years of struggling in Canada. He returned to Nigeria in September 1993.

Iyobo started his Ministry in 2001 with only six women. It later opened branches in Italy and Africa.

On getting to Italy, he was not comfortable with the environment and the lifestyle of people he met, and made plans to return to Canada. He claims that God wanted him to remain in Italy and created obstacles to his relocation. He experienced severe pain. His sickness was so terrible people thought he had HIV. Once he committed to stay in Italy, he recovered. In African Communities in Italy he found his ministry.

Personal life 
He married his wife Pastor Tessy Iyobo and they traveled to Italy in 1994. They have two sons: Michael and Paul.

References

Nigerian clergy
Living people
1961 births